Wila is a municipality in the district of Pfäffikon in the canton of Zürich in Switzerland.

Geography

Of this area, 38.4% is used for agricultural purposes, while 51.5% is forested. Of the rest of the land, 9.1% is settled (buildings or roads) and the remainder (1.1%) is non-productive (rivers, glaciers or mountains).   housing and buildings made up 6.4% of the total area, while transportation infrastructure made up the rest (2.9%). Of the total unproductive area, water (streams and lakes) made up 0.9% of the area.   8% of the total municipal area was undergoing some type of construction.

Wila is situated in the upper Töss Valley.

Demographics
Wila has a population of 1,903, of which 9.4% are foreign nationals.   the gender distribution of the population was 51% male and 49% female.  Over the last 10 years the population has grown at a rate of 7.4%.  Most of the population speaks German  (92.4%), with Albanian being second most common ( 1.9%) and Italian being third ( 1.1%).

In the 2007 election the most popular party was the SVP which received 51.3% of the vote.  The next three most popular parties were the SPS (14%), the CSP (11.5%) and the Green Party (7.7%).

The age distribution of the population is children and teenagers (0–19 years old) make up 28.8% of the population, while adults (20–64 years old) make up 59% and seniors (over 64 years old) make up 12.3%.  In Wila about 76.6% of the population (between age 25–64) have completed either non-mandatory upper secondary education or additional higher education (either university or a Fachhochschule).  There are 726 households in Wila.

Wila has an unemployment rate of 1.52%.  , there were 75 people employed in the primary economic sector and about 26 businesses involved in this sector.  243 people are employed in the secondary sector and there are 37 businesses in this sector.  226 people are employed in the tertiary sector, with 54 businesses in this sector.   46.7% of the working population were employed full-time, and 53.3% were employed part-time.

 there were 331 Catholics and 1074 Protestants in Wila. In the 2000 census, religion was broken down into several smaller categories. Of the rest of the population, 0% were Muslim, 4.1% belonged to another religion (not listed), 3.2% did not give a religion, and 10.2% were atheist or agnostic.

Transportation 
Wila railway station is a stop of the S-Bahn Zürich on the line S26.

References

External links 

 Official website 

Municipalities of the canton of Zürich